City Lights is the third album from Json. Lamp Mode Recordings released the project on July 20, 2010.

Reception

Specifying in a three and a half out of five review by Rapzilla, they recognizes, "Although 'City Lights' is not without its missteps (an unneeded feature here, a forgettable song there) these are hard to harp on considering the depth of this project. With this album, Json not only shows his capacity for being a consistently innovative artist, he sends out an S.O.S. on behalf of communities drowning in sin and calling for the Lifesaver." Josh Burkey, indicating in a four star out of five review for Indie Vision Music, responds, "Json's album 'City Lights' has a genuine message broadcasting throughout with a bang from start to finish."

Track listing

Charts

References

2010 albums
Json (rapper) albums